In mathematical physics and mathematics, the continuum limit or scaling limit of a lattice model refers to its behaviour in the limit as the lattice spacing goes to zero. It is often useful to use lattice models to approximate real-world processes, such as Brownian motion. Indeed, according to Donsker's theorem, the discrete random walk would, in the scaling limit, approach the true Brownian motion.

Terminology
The term continuum limit mostly finds use in the physical sciences, often in reference to models of aspects of quantum physics, while the term scaling limit is more common in mathematical use.

Application in quantum field theory

A lattice model that approximates a continuum quantum field theory in the limit as the lattice spacing goes to zero may correspond to finding a second order phase transition of the model. This is the scaling limit of the model.

See also
 Universality classes

References
H. E. Stanley, Introduction to Phase Transitions and Critical Phenomena
H. Kleinert, Gauge Fields in Condensed Matter, Vol. I,  " SUPERFLOW AND VORTEX LINES", pp. 1–742, Vol. II,  "STRESSES AND DEFECTS", pp. 743–1456,  World Scientific (Singapore, 1989);  Paperback   (also available online: Vol. I and Vol. II)
H. Kleinert and V. Schulte-Frohlinde, Critical Properties of φ4-Theories, World Scientific (Singapore, 2001);  Paperback  (also available online)

Lattice models
Lattice field theory
Renormalization group
Critical phenomena
Articles containing video clips